The Union of the Socialist Left (UGS) was a French movement of left-wing activists, founded at the end of 1957 by dissidents from the French Section of the Workers' International (SFIO); former resistants, until then close to the Communist Party; social Christian trade-unionists (Ligue de la jeune République and the minority of the Confédération Française des Travailleurs Chrétiens (CFTC)). It was the first alliance between social Christians and Marxists. The UGS merged with the Autonomous Socialist Party in 1960 to form the Unified Socialist Party (PSU).

Members 
Yvan Craipeau
Jean Maitron
Claude Bourdet

See also 
Unified Socialist Party (France)
LIP
French Fourth Republic
French Fifth Republic

Political parties of the French Fifth Republic
Socialist parties in France